Events from the year 1764 in Great Britain.

Incumbents
 Monarch – George III
 Prime Minister – George Grenville (Whig)
 Parliament – 12th

Events
 19 January – John Wilkes is expelled from the House of Commons for seditious libel for his article criticising King George III in The North Briton.
 5 April – Parliament passes the Sugar Act.
 19 April – the Currency Act passed which prohibits the American colonies from issuing paper currency of any form.
 23 April – Mozart family grand tour: 8-year-old W. A. Mozart settles in London for a year where he composes his Symphony No. 1.
 August – protests begin in Boston, Massachusetts against Britain's colonial policies.
 22 October – deposed Nawab of Bengal Mir Qasim defeated at the Battle of Buxar by the British East India Company.

Undated
 Specific and latent heats are described by Joseph Black.
 Industrial Revolution: James Hargreaves invents the Spinning Jenny.
 Holkham Hall, Norfolk, completed in the Palladian style by William Kent.
 Landscape gardener Lancelot "Capability" Brown is appointed Chief Gardener at the royal palace of Hampton Court; redesigns the gardens of Blenheim Palace in Oxfordshire; and works at Broadlands in Hampshire.
 The rock pillar called "Lot's Wife" amongst The Needles off the Isle of Wight collapses into the sea during a storm.

Publications
 James Ridley's pastiche Oriental stories The Tales of the Genii (supposedly translated by Sir Charles Morell from Persian).
 Horace Walpole's The Castle of Otranto, the first Gothic novel (supposedly translated by William Marshal from Italian).

Births
 Early – James Smithson, mineralogist, chemist and benefactor (died 1829)
 February – George Duff, Scottish naval officer (died 1805)
 13 March – Charles Grey, 2nd Earl Grey, Prime Minister of the United Kingdom (died 1845)
 1 April – Eclipse, racehorse (died 1789)
 3 April – John Abernethy, surgeon (died 1831)
 29 April – Ann Hatton, née Kemble, novelist (died 1838)
 2 May – Robert Hall, Baptist minister (died 1831)
 4 May – Joseph Carpue, surgeon (died 1846)
 5 May – Robert Craufurd, Scottish general (killed at Siege of Ciudad Rodrigo (1812))
 25 May – John Mason Good, writer (died 1827)
 19 June – Sir John Barrow, 1st Baronet, author and statesman (died 1848)
 21 June – Sidney Smith, admiral (died 1840)
 5 July – Daniel Mendoza, boxer (died 1836)
 9 July – Ann Radcliffe, née Ward, novelist (died 1823)
 17 September – John Goodricke, astronomer (died 1786)
 25 September – Fletcher Christian, sailor and mutineer (died 1793 in Pitcairn Islands)
 October – William Symington, Scottish mechanical engineer and steamboat pioneer (died 1831)
 3 December – Mary Lamb, writer and matricide (died 1847)
 Approximate date – Alexander Mackenzie, Scottish explorer of northern Canada (died 1820)

Deaths
 6 March – Philip Yorke, 1st Earl of Hardwicke, Lord Chancellor (born 1690)
 17 March
 William Oliver, physician (born 1695)
 George Parker, 2nd Earl of Macclesfield, astronomer (born c. 1696)
 15 April – John Immyns, attorney and lutenist (born c. 1700)
 29 June – Ralph Allen, businessman and politician (born 1693)
 7 July – William Pulteney, 1st Earl of Bath, politician (born 1683)
 2 September – Nathaniel Bliss, Astronomer Royal (born 1700)
 23 September – Robert Dodsley, writer (born 1703)
 2 October – William Cavendish, 4th Duke of Devonshire, Prime Minister (born 1720)
 26 October – William Hogarth, painter and satirist (born 1697)
 4 November – Charles Churchill, poet and satirist (born 1732)

References

 
Years in Great Britain